Karlsberg may refer to:

 Karlsberg Brewery (since 1878, alias Karlsbräu), in Homburg, Saarland, Germany
 Karlsberg Castle (1778–1793), a ruin in Homburg, Saarland, Germany
 Karlsberg Hill, near the German city of Homburg, Saarland

See also
 Carlsberg
 Burgruine Karlsberg, a castle in Carinthia, Austria